Paddison Wade "Pat" Preston (June 15, 1921 – June 23, 2002) was an American football player and coach and college athletics administrator.  He played professionally as a Guard for four seasons in the National Football League (NFL) with the Chicago Bears.  Preston served as the athletic director at Wake Forest University from 1954 to 1955.

References

External links
 

1921 births
2002 deaths
American football guards
Chicago Bears players
Duke Blue Devils football players
Wake Forest Demon Deacons athletic directors
Wake Forest Demon Deacons football coaches
Wake Forest Demon Deacons football players
People from Kernersville, North Carolina
People from Thomasville, North Carolina
Players of American football from North Carolina